The Orheim Company is a 2012 Norwegian drama film directed by Arild Andresen. It is a prequel to The Man Who Loved Yngve (2008) and I Travel Alone (2011).

Plot 
Jarle Klepp thinks back to his years as a teenager in a struggling family in Stavanger, Norway.

External links 
 

2012 films
Norwegian drama films
2012 drama films
2010s Norwegian-language films